Walker Creek is a stream in Apache County, Arizona.

History
Walker Creek was named in 1915 by Herbert E. Gregory for Captain Walker's Expedition of 1859.  Part of its length was followed by the Armijo Route of the Old Spanish Trail.

References

Rivers of Apache County, Arizona
Old Spanish Trail (trade route)
Rivers of Arizona